Nepal–Russia relations (Nepali: नेपाल रुस सम्बन्ध) are the bilateral relations between Russia and Nepal.

Background
Nepal and the Soviet Union had established diplomatic relations on June 5 - July 9, 1956. In April 1959, the countries signed several agreements, including the ones on economic and technical aid (foresaw free assistance in the construction of a hydroelectric power station with a power line, a sugar mill, a cigarette factory, and assistance in conducting prospecting works for the construction of a highway), and on free aid to Nepal for the construction of a hospital. In 1964, the Soviet Union and Nepal signed an agreement on free aid for the construction of an agricultural machinery plant.

Post-Soviet era
After the collapse of the Soviet Union, Nepal had extended full diplomatic recognition to the Russian Federation as its legal successor. Since then numerous bilateral meetings have taken place between both sides. Since 1992 numerous Nepalese students have gone to Russia for higher studies on a financial basis. In October 2005 the Foreign ministers of both countries met to discuss cooperation on a variety of issues including political, economic, military, educational, and cultural. Both countries maintain embassies in each other's capitals. Russia has an embassy in Kathmandu while Nepal has an embassy in Moscow.

External links

  Documents on the Nepal–Russia relationship at the Russian Ministry of Foreign Affairs
  Documents on the Nepal–Russia relationship at the Nepalese Ministry of Foreign Affairs

Diplomatic missions
  Embassy of Russia in Kathmandu
  Embassy of Nepal in Moscow

 
Russia
Bilateral relations of Russia